Kadyysky District  is an administrative and municipal district (raion), one of the twenty-four in Kostroma Oblast, Russia. It is located in the south of the oblast. Its administrative center is the urban locality (a settlement) of Kadyy. Population:  10,341 (2002 Census);  The population of Kadyy accounts for 50.5% of the district's total population.

People
 Andrei Tarkovsky (1932–1986)

References

Notes

Sources

Districts of Kostroma Oblast